Zhang Fangbing (born 19 January 1990) is a Chinese rower. He competed in the men's lightweight double sculls event at the 2012 Summer Olympics, with Sun Jie, finishing in 15th place.

References

1990 births
Living people
Chinese male rowers
Olympic rowers of China
Rowers at the 2012 Summer Olympics
People from Binzhou
Asian Games medalists in rowing
Rowers at the 2010 Asian Games
Asian Games gold medalists for China
Medalists at the 2010 Asian Games
Rowers from Shandong
20th-century Chinese people
21st-century Chinese people